Lenoir may refer to:

Locations:
 Lenoir, North Carolina, United States
 Lenoir County, North Carolina, United States
 Lenoir City, Tennessee

In Universities:
 Lenoir-Rhyne University
 Lenoir Dining Hall, a dining hall at the University of North Carolina at Chapel Hill

In other topics:
 USS Lenoir (AKA-74), a World War II attack cargo ship
 Lenoir cycle, the basis of the first commercially produced internal combustion engine

As a name:
 Lenoir (surname)

See also
Richard-Lenoir (Paris Metro)